Timothy Nuvangyaoma is a Hopi politician and firefighter. He serves as the chairperson and tribal leader of the Hopi Reservation in Arizona in the United States.

Career before politics
Nuvangyaoma is a former wildland fire fighter. He also worked in finance and was a volunteer for KUYI.

Political career

2018 election
Nuvangyaoma ran to unseat incumbent Herman Honanie. Nuvangyaoma won by "wide margin" and was sworn in on December 1, 2018. Honanie challenged the election, saying that Nuvangyaoma should have never been allowed to run for office because he had been arrested for driving under the influence in 2007. Honanie believes this violates the Hopi constitution that disallows someone running for chairperson if one has had a felony conviction within ten years. The election board did not reject Nuvangyaoma's application to run because his name was misspelled in the court records.

Tenure
Nuvangyaoma advocates for the continuation of the Special Diabetes Program for Indian, which has helped decrease diabetes rates amongst the Hopi nation since 2013. Nuvangyaoma has led efforts to repatriate cultural objects that were taken from sacred Hopi sites and are now held in museum collections. In October 2018, objects were successfully repatriated from the Finnish National Museum.

In March 2020, during the COVID-19 pandemic, Oraibi village had a new water well installed with CARES Act funds. Nuvangyaoma opposes the reservation being used for early COVID-19 vaccinations, stating in an interview with NBC News that “We already have the coronavirus here and I’m not going to subject my community members to be used as test models for something unless it’s safe.”

Nuvangyaoma, along with other tribal leaders, met with Kamala Harris and Joe Biden in October during the 2020 presidential campaign. After the meeting, Nuvangyaoma and other tribal leaders endorsed the Biden-Harris ticket. A few weeks later, the Hopi received a multi-million dollar grant from the Bureau of Indian Affairs to improve reservation water quality, triggered by his desire to remove arsenic from tribal water.

Personal life
Nuvangyaoma has been arrested multiple times for alcohol-related offenses. In 2007, he was arrested for driving under the influence. He served time in prison and was released in 2014.

References

Native American leaders
Hopi people
Arizona Democrats
American firefighters
21st-century American politicians
Year of birth missing (living people)
Living people
21st-century Native Americans